The First Army of the Republic of Turkey is one of the four field armies of the Turkish Army. Its headquarters is located at Selimiye Barracks in Istanbul. It guards the sensitive borders of Turkey with Greece and Bulgaria, including the straits Bosporus and Dardanelles. The First Army is stationed in East Thrace.

History
Ali İhsan Sabis is the first commander of the 1st Army, which has been operating since the Ottoman Empire. The 1st army depends on the Turkish Land Forces. The army is responsible for the Thrace region, the straits and the safety of Istanbul. Is commanded by a 4 star general. Under normal circumstances, the second duty of the Turkish Chief of General Staff is the next task. From 1983 to the present day, it was the first place where all the chiefs of the general staff served.

Formations

Order of Battle, 30 August 1922

On 30 August 1922, the First Army was organized as follows:

First Army HQ (Commander: Mirliva Nureddin Pasha, Chief of Staff: Miralay Mehmet Emin Bey)

Army reserve

3rd Cavalry Division (İbrahim Bey)
6th Infantry Division (Nazmi Bey)
I Corps (İzzettin Bey)
57th Infantry Division (Reşat Bey)
14th Infantry Division (Ethem Necdet Bey)
15th Infantry Division (Ahmet Naci Bey)
23rd Infantry Division (Ömer Halis Bey)
VI Corps (Kemalettin Sami Bey)
11th Infantry Division (Ahmet Bey)
12th Infantry Division (Osman Nuri Bey)
5th Caucasian Infantry Division (Dadaylı Halit Bey)
8th Infantry Division (Kâzım Bey)
II Corps (Ali Hikmet Bey)
7th Infantry Division (Ahmet Naci Bey)
4th Infantry Division (Mehmet Sabri Bey)
3rd Caucasian Infantry Division (Mehmet Kâzım Bey)
V Cavalry Corps (Fahrettin Bey)
1st Cavalry Division (Mürsel Bey)
2nd Cavalry Division (Ahmet Zeki Bey)
14th Cavalry Division (Mehmet Suphi Bey)

Order of Battle, 1941 

In June 1941, the First Army was organized as follows:

First Army HQ (Istanbul, Commander: Fahrettin Altay)
Thrace Area
X Corps (Kırklareli)
Çatalca Area
XX Corps
IV Corps (Çatalca)
Çatalca Fortified Area Command
3rd Corps (Çorlu)
Istanbul and Bosporus Area
Istanbul Command
Bosporus Fortified Area Command

Order of Battle, 1974 
In 1974 it consisted of four corps:

2nd Corps (Gelibolu)
3rd Corps (Istanbul)
5th Corps (Çorlu)
15th Corps (Köseköy, İzmit)

Order of Battle, 2010 
2nd Corps (Gelibolu, Çanakkale)
4th Mechanised Infantry Brigade (Keşan)
8th Mechanised Infantry Brigade (Tekirdağ)
18th Mechanised Infantry Brigade (Çanakkale)
95th Armored Brigade  (Malkara)
102nd Artillery Regiment (Uzunköprü)
Corps Engineer Combat Regiment (Gelibolu)
3rd Corps (NATO Rapid Deployment Corps, Şişli, Istanbul)
52nd Tactical Armored Division (Hadımköy, Istanbul)
2nd Armored Brigade (Kartal)
66th Mechanized Infantry Brigade (Istanbul)
23rd Tactical Motorized Infantry Division (Hasdal, Istanbul)
6th Motorized Infantry Regiment (Hasdal, Istanbul)
23rd Motorized Infantry Regiment (Samandıra, Istanbul)
47th Motorized Infantry Regiment (Metris, Istanbul)
5th Corps (Çorlu, Tekirdağ)
1st Armored Brigade (Babaeski)
3rd Armored Brigade (Çerkezköy)
54th Mechanized Infantry Brigade (Edirne)
55th Mechanized Infantry Brigade (Süloğlu)
65th Mechanized Infantry Brigade (Lüleburgaz)
Corps Armored Cavalry Battalion  (Ulaş)
105th Artillery Regiment (Çorlu)
Corps Engineer Combat Regiment (Pınarhisar)
15th Infantry Division (Köseköy, İzmit)
4th Army Aviation Regiment (Istanbul Samandıra Army Air Base)

See also

List of Commanders of the First Army of Turkey

References

Turkish 01 Army
Military units and formations of Turkey in the Turkish War of Independence
Military in Istanbul
Military units and formations established in 1923
1923 establishments in Turkey